Dag Christer Olaf Szepanski (born 25 December 1943) is a Swedish former footballer who played as a midfielder and striker. He was the 1967 Allsvenskan top scorer with Malmö FF and helped the club win both the 1967 Allsvenskan and 1967 Svenska Cupen titles. He made his only international appearance for the Sweden national team in 1972, scoring one goal in a 1974 FIFA World Cup qualifier against Malta.

Club career
Szepanski started his career with IFÖ Bromölla IF before signing with Malmö FF in 1967. During his debut season at Malmö, he was the 1967 Allsvenskan top scorer with 22 goals as Malmö was crowned Swedish champions. He also helped Malmö win the 1967 Svenska Cupen during the same season. In 1970 he signed for AIK, where he spent four seasons and was retrained to play as a midfielder. He finished off his career playing for Jönköping Södra and IF Väster.

International career 
Szepanski made his first and only international appearance for the Sweden national team on 15 October 1972 in a 1974 FIFA World Cup qualifier against Malta. Szepanski scored a goal from the penalty spot in a 7–0 win.

Personal life 
Szepanski is of Polish descent.

Career statistics 

 Scores and results list Sweden's goal tally first, score column indicates score after each Szepanski goal.

Honours 
Malmö FF
 Allsvenskan: 1967
 Svenska Cupen: 1967

Individual
 Allsvenskan top scorer: 1967

References

External links
 
 

1943 births
Living people
Association football forwards
Association football midfielders
Swedish footballers
Swedish people of Polish descent
Malmö FF players
Allsvenskan players
Sweden international footballers